The Kobo eReader is an e-reader produced by Toronto-based Kobo Inc (a subsidiary of Rakuten). The company's name is an anagram of "book". The original version was released in May 2010 and was marketed as a minimalist alternative to the more expensive e-book readers available at the time. Like most e-readers, the Kobo uses an electronic ink screen. The Arc tablet series, released between 2011 and 2013, was based on LCD technology instead.

E Ink devices

Chronological overview

Current

Common attributes
All Kobo e-readers share a unique pagination system giving users the option to count and reference pages separately within each chapter as opposed to the book as a whole. The latter, however, is user selectable as an alternative. Up until an update in January 2022 Kobo readers required connection to the Internet during the initial setup phase and did not work until they were connected to Kobo's servers; however, they now support "sideload mode," which allows the reader to be used without registering it to a Kobo account, Kobo e-readers support viewing KEPUB (Kobo's proprietary ebook format based off of the EPUB format), EPUB, Adobe PDF, plain text, HTML, and unprotected Mobipocket (MOBI, PRC) e-books. Some also support other formats, such as ZIM, unofficially.

Kobo Elipsa 
The Kobo Elipsa was released on 24 June 2021. It has a 10.3-inch E-Ink display at 1404x1872 pixels, with a density of 227 ppi.
It has Allwinner B300 SoC with built-in EDP controller.

Kobo Nia 
The Kobo Nia was released on 21 July 2020. It has a 6-inch E-Ink display at 1024x758 pixels, with a density of 212 ppi.

Kobo Libra 2 

The Libra 2 was released in October 2021. 

The Kobo Sage and Kobo Libra 2 are the first Kobo ereaders to come with Bluetooth support; thus, audiobooks can be played from the e-reader with the use of an external Bluetooth speaker. The Kobo Libra 2 is upgraded with USB-C over the previous standard, Micro-USB. The Libra 2 features a 7-inch E-Ink Carta 1200 display with 1680 x 1264 resolution and 300 PPI. It has 32 GB of storage.

Kobo Forma 

The Kobo Forma was released in November 2018. It has an 8-inch, 300 ppi E-Ink display that can be held by right- and left-handed people, and it can be flipped horizontally. It has physical page up and page down buttons to flip pages.

Kobo's website gives the following technical specifications:

Features: Waterproof IPX8 - up to 60 mins in 2 meters of water
Screen: 8.0" 300 PPI E Ink Mobius Carta display, 1920x1440 resolution, flexible substrate
Weight: 197 g
Size: 160 x 177.7 x 8.5 (thickness at gripping area) & 4.2 (thickness at the thinner side)
Storage: 8 GB or 32 GB
Front-light: ComfortLight PRO – Adjustable color temperature
Customizability with 11 different fonts and over 50 font styles with a font weight and sharpness setting
Supported formats: 14 file formats supported natively (EPUB, EPUB3, PDF, MOBI, JPEG, GIF, PNG, BMP, TIFF, TXT, HTML, RTF, CBZ, CBR)
Connectivity: Wi-Fi 802.11 b/g/n, Micro USB
Battery Life: 1200 mAh, weeks of battery life

Kobo Clara 2E 

The Clara 2E was released in  September 2022. It has a 6-inch E-Ink display with 1448 x 1072 resolution and 300 ppi.

Discontinued

Kobo eReader 
Kobo Inc. announced its first e-reader on 24 March 2010, at the CTIA show. The device was officially released on 1 May 2010. It had expandable memory, holding an additional 4 GB via an SD slot and limited wireless connectivity via Bluetooth to select Blackberry wireless devices. It was available in black or white and came preloaded with 100 public domain books. It was manufactured by Netronix Inc., a Taiwan based company with factories in Taiwan and China.

The pricing strategy of the original Kobo, at US$149, was to rival the Amazon Kindle, which was US$110 more expensive. However, in June 2010, just after the Kobo was released, Amazon dropped the price of the Kindle to US$189. Its pricing strategy in Australia was similarly aggressive where it was available for A$199, again A$100 less than the Kindle. Borders Australia said that they hoped to sell high volumes of the Kobo to drive up sales at their e-content store.

The original Kobo received a mediocre review from CNET, which said that, while the Kobo was compact, lightweight and affordable, the lack of Wi-Fi or 3G made it outdated, especially when there were similarly priced eReaders available with those features.

In December 2010, the original Kobo's feature set was updated with a firmware update to more closely match the Wifi model.

Kobo Wi-Fi 
A new model with Wi-Fi capability was released on 15 October 2010. It included an improved processor, screen, and new colour choices (porcelain/metallic silver, porcelain/pearlized lilac, and onyx). The SD expansion had been improved to claim a capacity for up to 10,000 books with a 32GB SD card. Other improvements included a longer battery life and a built-in dictionary.

Like the original model, the Wi-Fi model came pre-loaded with 100 public domain books.

Kobo Touch 

The Kobo Touch was released in June 2011. It introduced an infrared 6-inch touchscreen interface. Other improvements compared to the Kobo Wi-Fi included an E Ink Pearl screen, a faster processor capable of PDF panning, 802.11n capability, and reduced size and weight.

Kobo Glo 

The Kobo Glo is an e-reader released on 6 September 2012. It is a front-lit, touch-based E Ink reader. The Kobo Glo supports most ebook standards, including EPUB. It has a 6-inch touchscreen, 1024×768 resolution, 213 ppi, 6.53 oz, 2 GB of storage, and supports microSD.

Kobo Mini 

The Kobo Mini is smaller, at 5-inch, and lighter than standard ebook readers. It was released on 6 September 2012. It has 2GB internal storage and Wi-Fi. The 5" E Ink Vizplex screen has a resolution of 800x600 with 200 ppi.

Kobo Aura 

The Kobo Aura is the baseline e-reader with a 6-inch E Ink ClarityScreen display with 1024×768 resolution, 16-level grey scale, and a built-in LED front-light. It has 4GB storage, weighs 173g (6.1 oz), has two months of battery life, a Freescale i.MX507 1 GHz processor, and a microSD expansion slot. It was released in September 2013.

Kobo Aura HD 

The Aura HD was a limited-edition device, released on 25 April 2013, with a 6.8-inch E Ink display, with a high resolution of 1440×1080 with 265 ppi. It is 8.47 oz and has a microSD expansion slot. Other improvements compared to the Kobo Touch included a built-in "ComfortLight" LED light, a faster processor (1 GHz), twice the onboard storage (4 GB), and twice the battery life (estimated at two months).

Kobo Aura H2O 
The Aura H2O, released on 1 October 2014, is the second commercial waterproof e-reader. It has an upgraded version of the Aura HD's 6.8-inch E Ink Carta display with a resolution of 1440×1080 with 265 ppi. While its screen is improved over the Aura HD, it contains the same processor, on-board storage, and software as the Aura HD, and has dust/waterproofing – certified to be immersed for up to 30 minutes in up to 1 meter of water with its port cover closed.

Kobo Glo HD 
The Kobo Glo HD, released on 1 May 2015, is an e-reader with an E Ink Carta screen and is the successor to 2012's Glo. It has a 6-inch screen in a resolution of 1448×1072, or 300 ppi, matching the resolution of the Kindle Voyage.

Kobo Touch 2.0 
The Kobo Touch 2.0 was released on 8 September 2015, as an entry level e-reader with an E Ink Pearl 6-inch display with a resolution of 800×600 and 167 ppi. The exterior is similar in appearance to the Kobo Glo HD and it has a 1 GHz Freescale i.MX6 Solo Lite Processor and 4 GB of internal storage.

Kobo Clara HD 

The Clara HD was released on 5 June 2018. It has a 6-inch, 300 ppi screen.

Kobo Aura One 
The Kobo Aura One was released on 6 September 2016, and it is the first e-reader with a 7.8-inch E Ink Carta HD waterproof touchscreen display with a 300 ppi screen. The Aura One weighs 252 grams and measures 195 by 138.5 by 6.9 mm. It has Wi-Fi, 8 GB internal storage, and 512 MB RAM.  The Aura One is lit by nine white LEDs and eight RGB LEDs around the frame. The additional RGB LEDs allow the device to have a night reading mode that limits the blue light that comes from white LEDs. The Aura One was the first Kobo eReader with built-in OverDrive support.

Kobo Aura Edition 2 
The Kobo Aura Edition 2 was released with the Kobo Aura One in September 2016 as "a refreshed version of a beloved classic". It has a 6-inch E Ink Carta display with a resolution of 1024×768 at 212 ppi. The exterior styling is similar to the Kobo Aura One. Unlike the original Kobo Aura, there is no MicroSD slot. The specifications are otherwise similar to the original Kobo Aura.

Kobo Aura H2O Edition 2 
The Kobo Aura H2O Edition 2 was released in May 2017. It has a 6.8-inch E Ink HD Carta waterproof IPX8 display at 265 ppi. Its LED light, called the "ComfortLight PRO", can automatically reduce blue-light exposure during the night to lower the screen's effect on sleep.

Kobo Libra H2O 
Kobo Libra H2O was released on 15 September 2019.

The Libra features a 7-inch E Ink Carta HD display with a resolution of 1,680 x 1,264 and 300 PPI.

Market share

Global

Canada 
The Kobo e-reading platform was, as of January 2012, the best-selling in Canada. Research firm Ipsos-Reid estimating that Kobo e-readers represented 46% of the Canadian market.

France 
As of spring 2012, Kobo had 50% of the market share in France.

Other countries 
In August 2013, Kobo was the second largest ebook retailer in Japan, and Forbes estimated it at 3% of the market share in the United States.

Selected subsidiaries 
In October 2012, Kobo Inc. acquired the digital publishing platform Aquafadas to increase the content available on its e-reader devices.

See also
 Comparison of e-book readers
 Comparison of tablet computers
 Amazon Kindle
 Barnes & Noble Nook
 Sony Reader
 Calibre – open source software to manage a digital library with support of conversion between common e-book formats

References

External links

 

Dedicated ebook devices
Electronic paper technology
eReader
Computer-related introductions in 2010